Another Me is a 2019 Chinese television series starring Shen Yue, Chen Duling, Xiong Ziqi and Zou Tingwei. It is based on the 2016 film Soul Mate which is an adaptation of the novel of the same name by Anni Baobei. The series aired on iQiyi from July 22 to September 4, 2019.

Plot
An Sheng and Qiyue grew up together in a small city in the South. The two girls had contrasting personalities: An Sheng is bright and energetic, while Qiyue is quiet and reserved. They met one rainy day, when Qiyue handed an umbrella to An Sheng and disappeared. From that day on, they were best friends and attended the same school. Yet, they would eventually become tangled in a love triangle.

An Sheng helped Qiyue pursue Jia Ming, but Jia Ming gradually became attracted to the interesting An Sheng. In order to save their friendship, An Sheng decided to start a new relationship with another man. After graduating university, Qiyue planned her wedding with Jia Ming, but Jia Ming couldn't forget An Sheng. He left Qiyue in search of An Sheng, and that day, the friendship between An Sheng and Qiyue was ruined.

Cast

Main
 Shen Yue as Li An Sheng
 Chen Duling as Lin Qiyue
 Xiong Ziqi as Su Jiaming
 Zou Tingwei as Han Dong

Supporting
Connor Leong as Lin Jiu Yue
Cui Baoyue as Tian Xunlei
Qiao Junda as Xu Tian

Production
The drama started filming in Ningbo on May 6, 2018. It wrapped up filming on September 3, 2018.

Soundtrack

Awards and nominations

References

External links
 
 

2019 Chinese television series debuts
Television shows based on Chinese novels
Chinese romance television series
2010s college television series
2019 Chinese television series endings
Television series by iQiyi Pictures
Television series by Perfect World Pictures
IQIYI original programming
2019 web series debuts